The Chief Government Whip is a position in the Parliament of Sri Lanka.

List of Chief Government Whips

Parties

See also
Parliament of Sri Lanka 
Cabinet of Sri Lanka

References

External links
Parliament of Sri Lanka - Handbook of Parliament,